Proximity may refer to:

 Distance, a numerical description of how far apart objects are
 Proxemics, the study of human spatial requirements and the effects of population density
 Proximity (2000 film), an action/thriller film
 Proximity (2020 film), a science fiction drama film
 Proximity fuze, a fuze that detonates an explosive device automatically when the distance to the target becomes smaller than a predetermined value
 Proximity sensor, a sensor able to detect the presence of nearby objects without any physical contact
 Proximity space, or nearness space, in topology
 Proximity (horse)

See also